William Stout (born 1949) is an American artist.

William Stout may also refer to:

William Stout (rower) (1841–1900), British rowing champion
William Bushnell Stout (1880–1956), known as Bill, American inventor and aviation designer
Bill Stout (William Job Stout, 1927–1989), American broadcast journalist 
Bill Stout, 1999–2000 president of the International Commission of Agricultural and Biosystems Engineering